Avalon Hill has published games as an independent developer and publisher, through its subsidiary Victory Games, its video game divisions, and later as a brand of Hasbro.

Original Avalon Hill
Some of these were originally developed independently and repackaged/republished by Avalon Hill.  The games came in two formats: the earlier games were traditional flat-box packaging, and a later series introduced bookcase compact format packaging.

Victory Games

Video games

Hasbro Avalon Hill
Some of these were originally developed independently and repackaged/republished by AH. Those marked re-issue were also previously published by AH before Hasbro bought the company.

References

Avalon Hill
Avalon Hill
Avalon Hill